Cañada Alamosa may mean:

A valley:
 Cañada Alamosa, former name of Monticello Canyon, a valley in Sierra County and Socorro County, New Mexico. 
 Cañada Alamosa (tributary of Rio Vallecitos), a valley and a tributary stream of Rio Vallecitos in Rio Arriba County, New Mexico. 
A town:
 Cañada Alamosa, or Canada Alamosa (Americanized), the original name of Monticello, New Mexico, a town in Monticello Canyon. These names were also used, mistakenly, during the Civil War for the earlier town of San Ygnacio de la Alamosa at the mouth of the Cañada Alamosa/Monticello Canyon valley.